Suleman (also transliterated Sulaiman, or Sulaymān) (in Arabic name ) is the Arabic version of the name Solomon, the scriptural figure identified as either king of Israel or a Muslim prophet. The name means "man of peace".

Suleman may refer to:

Solomon, the scriptural figure in Islam
Farid Suleman, (b. ? ) chief executive officer of Citadel Broadcasting
Haris Suleman, (1996–2014), American pilot
Nadya Suleman, (b. 1975), mother of octuplets
Suleman Raza, (b. 1980),  Pakistani food entrepreneur and activist
The Suleman octuplets, octuplets born January 26, 2009

See also
Suleman virani
Solomon (disambiguation)
Sleiman
Slimane
Soliman (disambiguation)
Sulaiman (disambiguation)
Sulejman
Sulayman
Suleyman
Süleymanoğlu